Mohamed N'Diaye (born 29 December 1997) is a Guinean football midfielder who plays for SOAR.

References

1997 births
Living people
Guinean footballers
Guinea international footballers
FC Séquence de Dixinn players
Horoya AC players
Association football midfielders